Hazel Kathleen Waters is a British librarian, editor and historian. She was librarian of the Institute of Race Relations (IRR) and an assistant editor of the journal Race & Class. She has published on racism and Black people on the 19th-century British stage, particularly Ira Aldridge.

Life
Waters became a full-time employee of the Institute of Race Relations in 1969. She worked there as senior librarian and later as assistant editor of Race & Class, collaborating with Ambalavaner Sivanandan.

In 2002 Waters gained a PhD from the University of London, with a thesis on the black presence on the English stage between the late-18th and mid-19th century. Her resultant monograph, Racism on the Victorian stage (2007), was welcomed as an "important book".

Works
 (ed. with Ambalavaner Sivanandan) Register of research on Commonwealth immigrants in Britain. London: Institute of Race Relations, 1970.
 (with Cathie Lloyd) 'France: One Culture, One People?, Race & Class 32:3 (January–March 1991), pp.49–65
 (ed.) Resource directory on 'race' and racism in social work. London: Institute of Race Relations, 1993.
 'The Great Irish Famine and the Rise of Anti-Irish Racism', Race & Class 37:1 (1995), pp.95–108
 'Ira Aldridge and the Battlefield of Race', Race & Class, 45:1 (2003), pp.1–30
 Racism on the Victorian stage: representation of slavery and the black character. Cambridge: Cambridge University Press, 2007.
 'Ira Aldridge's Fight For Equality', in Bernth Lindfors, ed., Ida Aldridge: the African Roscius. University of Rochester Press, 2007. 
 Harriet Beecher Stowe's Other Novel — Dred on the London Stage, Race & Class'' 53:2 (2011), pp.81–82

References

Year of birth missing (living people)
Living people
Black British culture
Historians of theatre
British librarians
Alumni of the University of London
British women librarians